No Banners, No Bugles (New York: Dodd, Mead & Company, 1949) is a book by Edward Ellsberg describing his activities as Principal Salvage Officer for Operation Torch during World War II.

Like his book Under the Red Sea Sun about salvage work in Massawa earlier in the war, this book describes daring adventures and monumental accomplishments. It also describes cases where red tape, incompetence, and cowardice caused valuable ships to be lost.

References

Bibliography 

1949 non-fiction books
Books about World War II